Interferon beta is a protein that in humans is encoded by the IFNB1 gene. The natural and recombinant protein forms have antiviral, antibacterial, and anticancer properties.

Interferon beta 1a (tradenames: Avonex and Rebif) and Interferon beta 1b (tradenames: Betaseron/Betaferon) are used as drugs.

References

Further reading